The 1964-65 Central Professional Hockey League season was the second season of the Central Professional Hockey League, a North American minor pro league. Six teams participated in the regular season, and the St. Paul Rangers won the league title.

Regular season

Playoffs

External links
 Statistics on hockeydb.com

CPHL
Central Professional Hockey League seasons